Elijah Siegler is the chair of the Religious Studies department at the College of Charleston.

References

College of Charleston faculty
Living people
Year of birth missing (living people)
American religion academics
Place of birth missing (living people)
Harvard College alumni
University of California, Santa Barbara alumni